The Páez people, also known as the Nasa, are a Native American people who live in the southwestern highlands of Colombia, especially in the Cauca Department, but also the Caquetá Department lowlands and Tierradentro.

Religion
In the early 1900s, Lazarists built missions among the Paez and began the work to convert them to Christianity. Jesuits had originally tried to convert the Paez, but failed. However, the Lazarists met some success.  The Paez developed a syncretic form of Roman Catholicism that absorbed their indigenous religion.  For example, the Paez have shamans but many have also become Roman Catholic priests.

Climate adaptation

Since they live in the cold climate of the Andes, the Paez build their homes using brick, metal, cement, and wood. The Paez women raise and shear sheep for wool. They clean the wool, spin yarn from it, dye it and knit clothes and blankets for their families.

Punishment
Punishment for wrongs is strict in the Paez culture. In June 2000, the Paez whipped an adulterous tribal leader and his mistress 17 strokes with a knotted leather whip. "As a Paez Indian," the flogged tribal leader said, "I'm proud to have received this punishment because it is glorifying my  race." Stripping the one being punished of his clothing and dunking him in a cold mountain lake is another form of punishment—this was done to Senator Jesus Pinacue, a Paez who defied the community by supporting a political candidate in a presidential vote.

Economy 
Many Paez are agriculturists and common crops grown include potatoes, coffee, cassava, plantains, coca, and hemp.

Present day
The Paez people have been targeted by both rebels and paramilitary groups in the Colombian conflict. In 2019, alone 36 members of the tribe were murdered, and in July 2019 there were a reported 57 attacks on the Paez and other indigenous groups in Colombia. In October 2020, they rallied in the Colombian capital, Bogotá, due to an increase in violence in their territories.

See also

 Álvaro Ulcué Chocué (1943–1984)
 Coca Sek
 Gaitana
 Kpish, a pre-Columbian Páez deity
 Páez, Cauca
 Paez language

References

Further reading

External links

A Portrait of a Páez

Indigenous peoples in Colombia
Circum-Caribbean tribes
Indigenous peoples of the Andes